Sofiane Younès (born November 25, 1982 in El Biar, Algiers) is a former Algerian football player who played as a winger in the Algerian Ligue Professionnelle 1.

Club career
On July 23, 2010, Younès signed a one-year contract with JS Kabylie.

Honours
 Won the Algerian Cup three times: 
 Twice with MC Alger in 2006 and 2007
 Once with JS Kabylie in 2011
 Won the Algerian Super Cup twice with MC Alger in 2006 and 2007
 Has 2 caps for the Algerian National Team
 Won the CAF Champions League with ES Sétif in 2014.
Won the CAF Super Cup with ES Sétif in 2015.
Won the Algerian Ligue Professionnelle 1 with ES Sétif in 2015.

References

External links
 

1982 births
Algerian footballers
Algeria international footballers
Living people
People from El Biar
MC Alger players
CR Belouizdad players
JS Kabylie players
USM El Harrach players
Algerian Ligue Professionnelle 1 players
Algeria under-23 international footballers
Kabyle people
Association football forwards
21st-century Algerian people